USNS Red Cloud (T-AKR 313) is one of Military Sealift Command's nineteen Large, Medium-Speed Roll-on/Roll-off (LMSR) Ships and is one of the 49 ships in the prepositioning program. She is a Watson-class vehicle cargo ship named for Corporal Mitchell Red Cloud, Jr., a Medal of Honor recipient, after whom Camp Red Cloud in Korea is also named.

Laid down on 29 June 1998 and launched on 7 August 1999, Red Cloud was put into service on 18 January 2000.

In 2003 Red Cloud was deployed to transport U.S. Army vehicles to Kuwait to support Operation Iraqi Freedom.

On 12 August 2015, an Army UH-60 Black Hawk helicopter crashed on the deck of the Red Cloud when demonstrating capabilities to the Japan Ground Self-Defense Force. The Red Cloud was operating approximately eight miles east of Ukibaru Island. Of the seventeen service members on board the helicopter, only seven suffered non-life-threatening injuries.

References

Gallery

External links

 Photo gallery at navsource.org

 

Watson-class vehicle cargo ships
Ships built in San Diego
1999 ships